Simbal is a town in Northern Peru, capital of the district Simbal in Trujillo Province of the region La Libertad. This town is located some 40 km east of Trujillo city and is primarily an agricultural center in the Valley of Moche.

Nearby cities
Trujillo, Peru
Víctor Larco Herrera
Otuzco

See also
La Libertad Region
Poroto
Moche River

External links
Location of Simbal by Wikimapia

References

Populated places in La Libertad Region